The men's heavyweight event was part of the weightlifting programme at the 1936 Summer Olympics. The weight class was the heaviest contested, and allowed weightlifters over 82.5 kilograms. The competition was held on Wednesday, 5 August 1936.

Results

All figures in kilograms.

References

Sources
 Olympic Report	

Heavyweight